The Judge Charles J. Vallone School is Public School 85 in Queens, New York, USA.

History

Located in Astoria, Queens, the school was built in 1907 and celebrated its 100-year anniversary in June 2007. The school was dedicated to Judge Charles J. Vallone on February 18, 1988. Prior to 1988 it was the Humphry Davy School, named after the Cornish scientist.

Demographics
The school serves approximately 450 students from Pre-kindergarten to Grade 5, coming from over 40 different countries and speaking at least 14 different languages. 13.5% of newly admitted students are recent immigrants. 117 students are English Language Learners, 16 of whom are Special Education students.

References

https://web.archive.org/web/20110715135039/http://queenscourier.com/articles/2007/10/03/news/regional_news/forest_hills_and_western_courier/news/news01.txt
http://www.carnegiehall.org/article/box_office/events/evt_10253_ma.html?selecteddate=10302007
http://www.nydailynews.com/boroughs/queens/2007/09/25/2007-09-25_from_boring_park_to_field_of_dreams.html

Public elementary schools in Queens, New York
Magnet schools in New York (state)
Long Island City